Gómez de Toledo Solís (died 1521) was a Roman Catholic prelate who served as Bishop of Plasencia (1508–1521).

Biography
On 22 December 1508, Gómez de Toledo Solís was appointed during the papacy of Pope Julius II as Bishop of Plasencia. He served as Bishop of Plasencia until his death in 1521.

References

External links and additional sources
 (for Chronology of Bishops)  
 (for Chronology of Bishops) 

16th-century Roman Catholic bishops in Spain
Bishops appointed by Pope Julius II
1521 deaths